This is a complete list of all the singles that entered the VG-lista - the official Norwegian hit-chart - in 1961. 50 singles entered the VG-lista in 1961 altogether and these are all listed below according to how well they have charted over time.

Detailed listing of Number-ones in 1961

Top singles of 1961

External links
 VG-Lista - the official Norwegian hit-chart
 VG-lista - Top 100 singles of all time in Norway

Norwegian record charts
Norwegian music
Norwegian music-related lists
1961 in Norwegian music